Dysdercus andreae, or St. Andrew's cotton stainer, is a species of red bug in the family Pyrrhocoridae. It is found on islands in the Caribbean Sea and in North America. Its host plant is Thespesia populnea, which it feeds on the seeds and fruits of.

References

External links

 

Pyrrhocoridae
Articles created by Qbugbot
Bugs described in 1758
Taxa named by Carl Linnaeus